The Jafetz Chaim Synagogue of Santiago (Spanish: Sinagoga Jafetz Jaim) is a Chilean house of worship of the Jewish community, located in Santiago, Chile. The synagogue follows the customs of Orthodox Judaism. The synagogue has two rabbis and offers daily religious services and celebrations of the Jewish calendar.

References

Jews and Judaism in Chile
Orthodox Judaism in South America
Orthodox synagogues